Schwarzer Faden was a quarterly anarchist magazine published between 1980 and 2004.

Further reading

External links 
 
 

 Index in Dataspace

1980 establishments in West Germany
2004 disestablishments in Germany
Anarchist periodicals published in Germany
Defunct political magazines published in Germany
German-language magazines
Magazines disestablished in 2004
Magazines established in 1980
Quarterly magazines published in Germany